Ghohrud, also Romanized as Ghohrud and Qohrūd and Ghohrood and Qahrū and Ghahru and Ghahrood and G also known as Kūhrūd) is a village in Ghohrud Rural District, Qamsar District, Kashan County, Isfahan Province, Iran. At the 2006 census, its population was 657, in 246 families. Original name writing is Ghohrud correctly.

References 

Populated places in Kashan County